The men's 1500 metres race of the 2014–15 ISU Speed Skating World Cup 3, arranged in Sportforum Hohenschönhausen, in Berlin, Germany, was held on 7 December 2014.

Jan Szymański of Poland won, followed by Sverre Lunde Pedersen of Norway in second place, and Thomas Krol of the Netherlands in third place. Haralds Silovs of Latvia won Division B.

Results
The race took place on Sunday, 7 December, with Division B scheduled in the morning session, at 10:56, and Division A scheduled in the afternoon session, at 13:42.

Division A

Division B

References

Men 1500
3